Stories We Could Tell: The RCA Years is a country rock compilation album by The Everly Brothers, released in 2003. The original LP Stories We Could Tell was produced by Paul Rothchild and released by RCA Victor in 1972. This CD contains the original album plus eight of the twelve tracks from the Everlys' other RCA album, Pass the Chicken & Listen.

Track listing 
"All We Really Want To Do" (Bonnie Bramlett, Delaney Bramlett) – 2:22
"Breakdown" (Kris Kristofferson) – 3:12
"Green River" (Don Everly, Phil Everly) – 4:42
"Mandolin Wind" (Rod Stewart) – 3:01
"Up in Mabel's Room" (Phil Everly, Terry Slater) – 3:15
"Del Rio Dan" (Jeff Kent, Doug Lubahn, Holli Beckwith) – 3:57
"Ridin' High" (Dennis Linde) – 2:41
"Christmas Eve Can Kill You" (Dennis Linde) – 3:26
"Three Armed, Poker-Playin' River Rat" (Dennis Linde) – 2:46
"I'm Tired of Singing My Song in Las Vegas" (Don Everly) – 3:14
"The Brand New Tennessee Waltz" (Jesse Winchester) – 3:11
"Lay It Down" (Gene Thomas) – 3:16
"Husbands and Wives" (Roger Miller) – 2:21
"Woman Don't Try to Tie Me Down"  (Joe Allen) – 3:59
"Sweet Memories" (Mickey Newbury) – 2:53
"Ladies Love Outlaws" (Lee Clayton) – 3:11
"Not Fade Away" (Buddy Holly, Norman Petty) – 1:58
"Somebody Nobody Knows" (Kris Kristofferson) – 3:38
"Good Hearted Woman" (Waylon Jennings, Willie Nelson) – 2:35
"Stories We Could Tell" (John Sebastian) – 3:19

Personnel
 Don Everly - guitar, vocals
 Phil Everly - guitar, vocals
 Delaney Bramlett - guitar, vocals
 Jeff Kent - guitar, vocals
 Dennis Linde - guitar, keyboards
 Geoff Muldaur - guitar
 Wayne Perkins - guitar
 John Sebastian - guitar, harmonica, vocals
 Waddy Wachtel - guitar
 Danny Weis - guitar
 Clarence White - guitar
 Ry Cooder - electric bottleneck guitar on "Green River" & "Del Rio Dan"
 Buddy Emmons - slide guitar
 Jerry McGee - slide guitar
 Barry Beckett - keyboards
 Michael Fonfara - keyboards 
 Spooner Oldham - keyboards
 Warren Zevon - keyboards
 Johny Barbata - drums
 Jim Gordon - drums
 Russ Kunkel - drums
 George Bohanon - brass
 Tommy Johnson - brass
 Chris Ethridge - bass
 Jimmie Haskell - string arrangement
 Delaney Bramlett - vocals
 David Crosby - vocals
 Doug Lubahn - vocals
 Graham Nash - vocals

References

The Everly Brothers compilation albums
Albums arranged by Jimmie Haskell
Albums produced by Paul A. Rothchild
Albums produced by Chet Atkins
2003 compilation albums